Swiss Fort Knox are two highly secured data centers under the Swiss Alps that are designed to provide "long-term access to our digital cultural and scientific assets".

References

External links
Official Website
Protecting the 21st century's most precious assets — in Swiss banks

Data centers